Brélès is a commune in the Finistère department of Brittany in northwestern France.

Population
Inhabitants of Brélès are called Brélésiens in French.

Sights
Château de Kergroadès, 17th century
Manoir de Bel Air, 15th century
Manoir de Brescanvel, 16th century

See also
Communes of the Finistère department
Yann Larhantec

References

External links

Official website 

 Mayors of Finistère Association  

Communes of Finistère